Don't Try This at Home is a compilation presented by American rap group The Dangerous Crew. It was released November 21, 1995 on Jive Records and Dangerous Music. The album was produced by Ant Banks, Father Dom, J-Dubb, L.A. Dre, Pee-Wee and Shorty B. It peaked at number 191 on the U.S. Billboard 200, at number 6 on the Billboard Top Heatseekers and at number 23 on the Billboard Top R&B/Hip-Hop Albums. The album features performances by Too Short, Spice 1, MC Breed, Erick Sermon and Goldy.

Critical reception 

Allmusic – "The Dangerous Crew's Don't Try This at Home...is a thoroughly enjoyable collection of West Coast hip-hop...the Dangerous Crew has a stellar lineup of MCs and they all contribute their fair share of first-rate rhymes. The production doesn't show much imagination, yet the personalities manage to make Don't Try This at Home an entertaining record."

Track listing

Chart history

Personnel 

 About Face – Performer
 Ant Banks – Mixing
 Brian Haught – Keyboards, Engineer, Digital Editing
 Catfish – Engineer
 Collision – Performer
 Doo Doo Brown – Performer
 Erick Sermon – Vocals, Performer
 Freddy B – Performer
 Father Dom – Performer  
 Goldy – Performer  
 MC Breed – Performer  

 Michael Hampton – Guitar  
 Pee-Wee – Performer, Producer, Keyboards  
 Ramone "Pee Wee" Gooden – Performer  
 Sean Brown – Vocals  
 Shock-G – Performer  
 Shorty B. – Performer, Producer, Bass Guitar
 Spice 1 – Performer
 Stan – Engineer
 Taj Tilghman – Engineer
 Tom Coyne – Mastering  
 Too Short – Performer

References

External links 
[ Don't Try This at Home] at Allmusic
Don't Try This at Home at Discogs
Don't Try This at Home at Tower Records

Ant Banks albums
The Dangerous Crew albums
Albums produced by Ant Banks
1995 compilation albums
Too Short compilation albums
Gangsta rap compilation albums
Jive Records compilation albums
West Coast hip hop compilation albums